Richard Röstel (born 1872 – after 1936) was a German gymnast.  He competed at the 1896 Summer Olympics in Athens.

Röstel was a member of the German team that won two gold medals by placing first in both of the team events, the parallel bars and the horizontal bar.  He also competed in the parallel bars, horizontal bar, vault, and pommel horse individual events, though without success.

References

External links
 

1872 births
Year of death missing
German male artistic gymnasts
Gymnasts at the 1896 Summer Olympics
19th-century sportsmen
Olympic gold medalists for Germany
Olympic medalists in gymnastics
Medalists at the 1896 Summer Olympics
Date of birth missing
Place of birth missing
Place of death missing